Rabigus is a genus of beetles belonging to the family Staphylinidae.

The species of this genus are found in Europe, Japan and Northern America.

Species:
 Rabigus abauriae (Gridelli, 1924) 
 Rabigus alienus (Eppelsheim, 1889)

References

Staphylinidae
Staphylinidae genera